Potters Marston is a village and civil parish in the district of Blaby in Leicestershire, England. It has a population of around 40, and is roughly between Huncote and Stoney Stanton, but closest to Croft. It has a view of the remaining side of croft quarry and has 12 houses. The population of the village at the 2011 census  was included in the civil parish of Croft.

The Church has a congregation of around 10 people, and was originally a barn which became a school house.

Villages in Leicestershire
Civil parishes in Leicestershire
Blaby